Colin John Podmore  (born 22 February 1960) is an English ecclesiastical historian and a senior layperson in the Church of England. Between April 2013 and February 2020 he was the director of Forward in Faith, a traditionalist Anglo-Catholic organization within the church. He was previously the secretary of the House of Clergy of the General Synod (2002–2011) and clerk to the General Synod (2011–2013).

Early life and education
Podmore was born on 22 February 1960 in Redruth, Cornwall, England. He studied history at Keble College, Oxford, and trained as a teacher at Selwyn College, Cambridge. After a period of work as a schoolteacher he came back to the University of Oxford as a researcher and his D.Phil. thesis on the Moravian Church in England was subsequently published.

Honours
In 2002, Podmore was elected a Fellow of the Royal Historical Society (FRHistS). In June 2017, he was awarded the Lanfranc Award for Education and Scholarship by the Archbishop of Canterbury "for services to education and scholarship in support of the Church of England and the wider Church". In the 2020 Queen's Birthday Honours, he was appointed Member of the Order of the British Empire (MBE) for services to the Church of England. He is president of the Society for the Maintenance of the Faith, an Anglo-Catholic organization coordinating patronage in the Church of England.

Selected works

 
  (based on the author's D.Phil. thesis)

References

1960 births
20th-century Anglicans
20th-century English historians
21st-century Anglicans
21st-century English historians
Alumni of Keble College, Oxford
Alumni of Selwyn College, Cambridge
Anglican scholars
Anglo-Catholic writers
British historians of religion
Ecclesiologists
English Anglo-Catholics
Schoolteachers from Cornwall
Fellows of the Royal Historical Society
Historians of Christianity
Living people
People from Redruth
Members of the Order of the British Empire